The Derek Trucks Band (often called simply, Derek Trucks) is the debut album by American Jazz/Blues/R&B group The Derek Trucks Band, released on October 7, 1997. The album was recorded between September 30-October 4, 1996 at Dockside Studios in Maurice, Louisiana. The album is composed mainly of re-arranged jazz and blues classics and the rest are original compositions by the band. Derek was seventeen years old at the time of the release of the album. In 2008, the album was made available digitally, and is now available on iTunes, and other online retailers like Real, Rhapsody, Yahoo! Music, eMusic, Napster and Puretracks.

Reception

In a review for AllMusic, Michael B. Smith called the album "A flawless recording," and described the band as "a group of tight-knit, talented musicians." He stated that Trucks "blazes through new arrangements of jazz and blues classics," and commented: "He turns the trumpet wizardry of Miles Davis into slide-guitar magic, and his readings of a couple of Coltrane tunes pack a terrific punch."

Writer Dean Budnick noted that the selection of tunes "provides the listener with a taste of each band member's considerable gifts," and also "demonstrates the group's affinity for jazz."

Bill Milkowski of JazzTimes praised Trucks' "monstrous slide guitar chops," and remarked: "Not many slide guitarists would bother to tackle material like John Coltrane's 'Mr. P.C.' and 'Naima,' Miles Davis' 'So What' or Wayne Shorter's 'Footprints,' but Trucks stretches on these jazzy vehicles with ferocious conviction."

Reviewer George Graham wrote: "Trucks still has the teenager's chutzpah that would lead him to attempt John Coltrane and Miles Davis on a slide guitar, but he already has enough experience and taste to make it come off remarkably well. The result is a very satisfying album with some impressive musicianship, and perhaps a surprise or two."

Author Alan Paul noted that the album "announced loud and clear that Trucks was not your average teenaged guitar whiz."

Track listing

Personnel
Band Members
Derek Trucks - guitar, sarod
Todd Smallie - bass guitar
Bill McKay - organ, keyboards, synthesizer, clavinet, piano, vocals (on track 3)
Yonrico Scott - drums, tympani, conga drums, shakers, tambourine, maracas, sabasa, chimes

Additional personnel
Gary Gazaway - trumpet, flugelhorn (on track 3,6)
John Snyder - producer
Tony Daigle - engineer
Benny Graeff - assistant engineer
Johnny Sandlin - mixing
Benny Graeff - assistant mixer
Tony Daigle - mastering
J. Flournoy Holmes - design and photography
Buddy Odom Management - management
Wayne Forte (Entourage Talent Associates, Ltd.) - booking
Kelly Elder - legal representation

References

1997 debut albums
Derek Trucks albums